The 2016 FIBA Asia Under-18 Championship for Women was the qualifying tournament for FIBA Asia at the 2017 FIBA Under-19 World Championship for Women. The tournament, which was also the 23rd edition of the biennial competition, took place in Bangkok, Thailand from November 13 to November 20, 2016.

China defeated Japan in the finals, 78–47, to notch their fourth straight title and 15th overall, while South Korea edged Chinese Taipei in the battle for Third Place, 66–63. China, Japan and South Korea will represent FIBA Asia at the 2017 FIBA Under-19 World Championship for Women, which will be held in Italy.

The championship was divided into two levels: Level I and Level II. The two lowest finishers of Level I (Thailand and India) met the top two finishers of Level II (Indonesia and Malaysia) to determine which teams qualified for the top Level of the 2018 Championships. Both Indonesia and Malaysia won promotion into Level I, with the losers, India and Thailand, being relegated to Level II.

Qualifying
Semifinalists of the 2014 FIBA Asia Under-18 Championship for Women:

Qualifying round winners at the 2014 FIBA Asia Under-18 Championship for Women:

Levels:
Level I include teams that won in the qualifying round and the semifinalists of the 2014 championship, including the hosts.
Level II are the other teams, depending who will submit their applications in participating in the tournament.

Participating teams
Included are teams' FIBA World Ranking prior to the tournament.

Preliminary round
All times are in Indochina Time (UTC+07:00)

Level I

Level II

Qualifying round
Winners are promoted to Level I of the 2018 FIBA Asia Under-18 Championship for Women.

Final round
Top three teams qualify for the 2017 FIBA Under-19 World Championship for Women.

Semifinals

Third place game

Final

Final standing

Awards

References

External links
 2016 FIBA Asia U-18 Championship for Women

2016
2016 in women's basketball
2016–17 in Asian basketball
2016–17 in Thai basketball
International women's basketball competitions hosted by Thailand
2016 in youth sport